The Speaker of the Folketing (Danish: Folketingets formand) is the presiding officer of the Danish Parliament, Folketing. It was established on 3 January 1850. The incumbent speaker is Søren Gade who has been serving since 16 November 2022.

List of speakers of the Danish Parliament
Below is a list of office-holders:

See also
 List of speakers of the Landsting (1850-1953)

References
 Notes

 Footnotes

Sources
 Rulers.org

 
Denmark, Folketing